David K. Myers (born August 8, 1959) is an American professional baseball scout. A former minor league infielder, he later was a minor league manager and coach, and a coach with the Seattle Mariners of Major League Baseball (MLB).

Biography

Myers graduated from William Penn Senior High School in York, Pennsylvania, where he was a two-sport standout in baseball and basketball. He then attended Temple University, where he played for Temple Owls baseball coach Skip Wilson. Teammates included Pete Filson, who pitched in MLB during 1982–1990. Myers was selected by the New York Yankees in the 27th round of the 1980 Major League Baseball draft, but did not sign. He was named the Temple Owls' most valuable player for his redshirt junior year in 1981.

Following his junior year, Myers was selected by the Seattle Mariners in the 13th round (312th overall) in the 1981 MLB draft. He played eight seasons of Minor League Baseball in the Seattle system, including four years at the Double-A level. As a minor leaguer, Myers appeared in 795 games, compiling a .272 batting average with 26 home runs and 348 RBIs. Defensively, he played mostly as a shortstop, while appearing at all other infield positions as well as in the outfield and at catcher. He also pitched a total of  innings in five games.

Myers then managed Mariners' farm clubs for 12 seasons, 1989–2000, the last five as skipper of the Triple-A Tacoma Rainiers of the Pacific Coast League. He next joined the major league staff of Lou Piniella for the 2001 Seattle Mariners season. In his first season as the Mariners' third-base coach, Seattle won an American League-record 116 games. Myers served as third-base coach for Seattle through the 2004 season. In 2006, he managed a final season in the minor leagues with the Everett AquaSox, Seattle's Class A Short Season affiliate. During his 13 seasons as a minor league manager, his teams compiled a 762–699 record, for a .522 winning percentage.

Myers next became a coach in the Cleveland Indians' organization after leaving the Mariners. He spent 2010–2015  as a coach for the Durham Bulls, the Triple-A International League affiliate of the Tampa Bay Rays. In 2016, Myers became a member of the Rays' professional scouting staff, based in Seattle.

References

External links
 

1959 births
Living people
Sportspeople from York, Pennsylvania
Temple Owls baseball players
Bakersfield Mariners players
Bellingham Mariners players
Chattanooga Lookouts players
Salinas Spurs players
Vermont Mariners players
Wausau Timbers players
Seattle Mariners coaches
Tampa Bay Rays scouts
Major League Baseball third base coaches
Minor league baseball managers
Baseball coaches from Pennsylvania